Sankt Martin am Wöllmißberg is a municipality in the district of Voitsberg in the Austrian state of Styria.

Geography
The municipality lies south of Köflach and Voitsberg.

References

Cities and towns in Voitsberg District